Henri Kontinen and John Peers defeated Raven Klaasen and Rajeev Ram in the final, 2–6, 6–1, [10–8] to win the doubles tennis title at the 2016 ATP World Tour Finals.

Jean-Julien Rojer and Horia Tecău were the reigning champions, but they failed to qualify this year.

Seeds

Alternates
  Juan Sebastián Cabal /  Robert Farah (Did not play)

Draw

Finals

Group Fleming/McEnroe
Standings are determined by: 1. number of wins; 2. number of matches; 3. in two-players-ties, head-to-head records; 4. in three-players-ties, percentage of sets won, then percentage of games won, then head-to-head records; 5. ATP rankings.

Group Edberg/Jarryd
Standings are determined by: 1. number of wins; 2. number of matches; 3. in two-players-ties, head-to-head records; 4. in three-players-ties, percentage of sets won, then percentage of games won, then head-to-head records; 5. ATP rankings.

References

External Links
Main Draw
Official Website

Doubles